Mar Thoma IX was the ninth Metropolitan of the Malankara Church in Kerala, India for a brief period in 1816. That year, he was consecrated Metropolitan by Mar Thoma VIII, but soon after his ordination he was dethroned by Pulikkottil Joseph who was appointed by the then British resident Colonel John Munroe.

Consecration
Iype, an uncle of Mar Thoma VIII, was born at Kadamattom. He was ordained as a Kathanar and was called "Iype Kathanar". While Mar Thoma VIII was on his death bed, he called Iype Kathanar, laid his hands on him, and consecrated him as his successor Mar Thoma IX.

As Metropolitan
Mar Thoma VIII consecrated Mar Thoma IX, as his successor. Soon after the death of his predecessor, while Mar Thoma IX was at Puthencavu, he had received a letter from the British Resident in Travancore Coln. Munroe that he was not the approved Metropolitan and should handover all the charges to Pulikkottil Joseph Mar Dionysious I (Mar Thoma X) who was consecrated by Mar Philexinos of Thozhiyoor.

Mar Thoma IX was taken to Kottayam, by Pulikkottil Joseph Mar Dionysious and took possession of all insignia from Mar Thoma IX. With tears in his eyes Mar Thoma left the Seminary premises at Kottayam and retired to his home parish Kadamattom palli, spending the rest of his days in prayer and fasting, as a great Monk.

Last days
He continued as a bishop till the end of his life. He died in 1817 and was laid to rest at St. George's Church, Kadamattom near Kolenchery, Muvattupuzha.

See also
 Malankara Jacobite Syriac Orthodox Church
 Malankara Orthodox Syrian Church
 Mar Thoma Syrian Church of Malabar
 Syrian Malabar Nasrani
 Saint Thomas Christians
 Christianity in India
 List of Catholicoi of the East and Malankara Metropolitans
 List of Syrian Malabar Nasranis

References

Further reading
Chacko, T. C. (1936) Malankara Marthoma Sabha Charithra Samgraham. (Concise History of Marthoma Church), Pub: E.J. Institute, Kompady, Tiruvalla.
Eapen, Prof. Dr. K. V. (2001). Malankara Marthoma Suryani Sabha Charitram. (History of Malankara Marthoma Syrian Church). Pub: Kallettu, Muttambalam, Kottayam.
Ittoop Writer (1906). Malayalathulla Suryani Chistianikauleday Charitram. (History of Syrian Christians in the land of Malayalam).
Mathew, N. M. Malankara Marthoma Sabha Charitram (History of the Marthoma Church), Volume 1 (2006), Volume II (2007), Volume III (2008). Pub. E.J.Institute, Thiruvalla.
Sankunny Kottarathil. (1909). Aythihamala. (1909). Aythihamala. (Legends). Current books.
Cheriyan, Dr. C. V. Orthodox Christianity in India. Kottayam, 2003.
P. V. Mathew. Nazrani Christians of Kerala (Malayalam) Vol. 2 Kochi, 1993.
Joseph Cheeran, Rev. Dr. Adv. P. C. Mathew (Pulikottil) and K. V. Mammen (Kottackal). Indian Orthodox Church History and Culture. (Malayalam) Kottackal Publishers, Kottayam.

External links 
 http://marthomasyrianchurch.org
 http://kadamattomchurch.org
 http://kadamattom.tripod.com - The old Syrian church at Kadamattom

Oriental Orthodoxy in India
People from Ernakulam district
Indian bishops
1817 deaths
Year of birth unknown
Syriac Orthodox Church bishops
Malankara Orthodox Syrian Church
Malankara Orthodox Syrian Church bishops